Roberto David Arrieta (born September 4, 1972) is an Argentine professional boxer in the Welterweight division and is the former WBC Mundo Hispano Super Featherweight Champion.

Pro career
In August 2008, Arrieta upset the undefeated Victor Cardozo Coronel to win the WBC Mundo Hispano Super Featherweight Championship.

Ortiz vs. Arrieta
On September 13, 2008 Arrieta was knocked out by future world champion and actor Victor Ortíz at the MGM Grand in Las Vegas, Nevada.

Professional boxing record 

|- style="margin:0.5em-size:95%;"
|align="center" colspan=8|40 Wins (20 knockouts), 17 Losses, 4 Draws
|- style="margin:0.5em auto; font-size:95%;"
|align=center style="border-style: none none solid solid; background: #e3e3e3"|Res.
|align=center style="border-style: none none solid solid; background: #e3e3e3"|Record
|align=center style="border-style: none none solid solid; background: #e3e3e3"|Opponent
|align=center style="border-style: none none solid solid; background: #e3e3e3"|Type
|align=center style="border-style: none none solid solid; background: #e3e3e3"|Rd., Time
|align=center style="border-style: none none solid solid; background: #e3e3e3"|Date
|align=center style="border-style: none none solid solid; background: #e3e3e3"|Location
|align=center style="border-style: none none solid solid; background: #e3e3e3"|Notes
|-align=center
|Win||40-17-4||align=left| Sergio Javier Escobar
|
|||||align=left|
|align=left|
|-align=center
|Win ||39-17-4 ||align=left| Ricardo Fabricio Chamorro
|||  ||  ||align=left|
|align=left|
|- align=center 
|Win ||38-17-4 ||align=left| Nestor Fabian Lagos
|||  ||  ||align=left|
|align=left|
|- align=center 
|Win ||37-17-4 ||align=left| Victor Cardozo Coronel
|||  ||  ||align=left|
|align=left|
|- align=center 
|Loss ||36-17-4 ||align=left| Alberto Leopoldo Santillan
|||  ||  ||align=left|
|align=left|
|- align=center 
|Win ||36-16-4 ||align=left| Norberto Adrian Acosta
|||  ||  ||align=left|
|align=left|
|- align=center 
|Loss ||35-16-4 ||align=left| Robert Guerrero
|||  ||  ||align=left|
|align=left|
|- align=center 
|Win ||35-15-4 ||align=left| Mario Alberto Quintuman
|||  ||  ||align=left|
|align=left|
|- align=center
|Loss ||34-15-4 ||align=left| Cassius Baloyi
|||  ||  ||align=left|
|align=left|
|- align=center
|Win ||34-14-4 ||align=left| Marcos Valdez
|||  ||  ||align=left|
|align=left|
|- align=center
|Win ||33-14-4 ||align=left| Matias Daniel Ferreyra
|||  ||  ||align=left|
|align=left|
|- align=center
|Win ||32-14-4 ||align=left| Cristian Palma
|||  ||  ||align=left|
|align=left|
|- align=center
|Win ||31-14-4 ||align=left| Alejandro Lima
|||  ||  ||align=left|
|align=left|
|- align=center
 |Loss ||30-14-4 ||align=left| Victor Ortiz
|||  ||  ||align=left|
|align=left|
|- align=center 
 |Win ||30-13-4 ||align=left| Victor Cardozo Coronel
|||  ||  ||align=left|
|align=left|
|- align=center 
 |Win ||29-13-4 ||align=left| Luis Ariel Rojas
|||  ||  ||align=left|
|align=left|
|- align=center
 |Win ||28-13-4 ||align=left| Diego Humberto Mora
|||  ||  ||align=left|
|align=left|
|- align=center  
 |Loss ||27-13-4 ||align=left| Vicente Escobedo
|||  ||  ||align=left|
|align=left|
|- align=center
 |Win ||27-12-4 ||align=left| Carlos Narvaez
|||  ||  ||align=left|
|align=left|
|- align=center  
 |Win ||26-12-4 ||align=left| Hardy Paredes
|||  ||  ||align=left|
|align=left|
|- align=center  
 |Win ||25-12-4 ||align=left| Miguel Dario Lombardo
|||  ||  ||align=left|
|align=left|
|- align=center  
 |Win ||24-12-4 ||align=left| Sergio Daniel Ledesma
|||  ||  ||align=left|
|align=left|
|- align=center  
 |Win ||23-12-4 ||align=left| Matias Daniel Ferreyra
|||  ||  ||align=left|
|align=left|
|- align=center  
|Loss ||22-12-4 ||align=left| Mzonke Fana
|||  ||  ||align=left|
|align=left|
|- align=center
|Win ||22-11-4 ||align=left| Javier Osvaldo Alvarez
|||  ||  ||align=left|
|align=left|
|- align=center  
|Win ||21-11-4 ||align=left| Ricardo Ariel Elias
|||  ||  ||align=left|
|align=left|
|- align=center  
|Loss ||20-11-4 ||align=left| Cesar Cuenca
|||  ||  ||align=left|
|align=left|
|- align=center  
|Win ||20-10-4 ||align=left| Justo Evangelista Martinez
|||  ||  ||align=left|
|align=left|
|- align=center  
|Win ||19-10-4 ||align=left| Julio Gonzalez
|||  ||  ||align=left|
|align=left|
|- align=center  
|Win ||18-10-4 ||align=left| Julio Gonzalez
|||  ||  ||align=left|
|align=left|
|- align=center  
 |Loss ||17-10-4 ||align=left| Aldo Nazareno Rios
|||  ||  ||align=left|
|align=left|
|- align=center  
 |Loss ||17-9-4 ||align=left| Julio Pablo Chacon
|||  ||  ||align=left|
|align=left|
|- align=center  
|Win ||17-8-4 ||align=left| Sergio Javier Benitez
|||  ||  ||align=left|
|align=left|
|- align=center  
 |Loss ||16-8-4 ||align=left| Diego Martin Alzugaray
|||  ||  ||align=left|
|align=left|
|- align=center  
 |Loss ||16-7-4 ||align=left| Aldo Nazareno Rios
|||  ||  ||align=left|
|align=left|
|- align=center  
|Win ||16-6-4 ||align=left| Javier Osvaldo Alvarez
|||  ||  ||align=left|
|align=left|
|- align=center  
 |Loss ||15-6-4 ||align=left| Carlos Rios
|||  ||  ||align=left|
|align=left|
|- align=center

References

External links

Argentine male boxers
Welterweight boxers
1975 births
Living people
People from La Pampa Province